The Servant is a 1963 British drama film directed by Joseph Losey. It was written by Harold Pinter, who adapted Robin Maugham's 1948 novella. The Servant stars Dirk Bogarde, Sarah Miles, Wendy Craig and James Fox. It opened at London's Warner Theatre on 14 November 1963.

The first of Pinter's four film collaborations with Losey, The Servant is a tightly constructed film about the psychological relationships among the four central characters and examines issues relating to social class.

Plot
Wealthy Londoner Tony, who says he is part of a plan to build cities in Brazil, moves into his new house, and hires Hugo Barrett as his manservant. Barrett appears to take easily to his new job, and he and Tony form a quiet bond, retaining their social roles. Relationships begin shifting, however, when Tony's girlfriend Susan meets Barrett. She is suspicious of Barrett and asks Tony to dismiss him, but he refuses.

To bring his lover, Vera, into his world, Barrett convinces Tony that the house also needs a maid. When Tony finally agrees, Barrett hires Vera on the pretext that she is his sister. Barrett encourages Vera to seduce Tony. Later, when Tony and Susan return early from a vacation, they find Barrett and Vera sleeping together. Believing that the two are siblings, he flies into a rage at Barrett, who then reveals that they are not related and she is his fiancée. He and Vera then make it clear that Tony was sleeping with her, to Susan's dismay. After Tony dismisses them, Susan departs silently.

At this point, Tony has become reliant on Barrett and Vera. He becomes a drunkard, which is exacerbated by Susan's refusal to answer his calls. Eventually, Tony encounters Barrett in a pub, who spins a tale about Vera having made fools of them both. He begs Tony to re-engage him as his manservant, and he agrees.

Gradually the two reverse roles, with Barrett taking more control and Tony retreating into infantilism. Barrett also insinuates Vera back into the house. Susan arrives and attempts to convince Tony to come back to her. She finds him totally dependent on Barrett who keeps him supplied with alcohol and prostitutes. She walks through the sordid scene, and suddenly kisses Barrett, who forcefully returns her attentions. As he grows more brutal, Susan struggles to free herself from his embrace, and Tony, rising from his drunken stupor, attempts to intervene. However, he trips and falls onto the floor, causing all the prostitutes to laugh at him. Tony then has an outburst and Barrett orders everyone to leave. Before departing, Susan slaps Barrett with the jeweled collar of her coat. Barrett is shocked, but quickly recovers and places her coat on her shoulder as she leaves. He then walks upstairs where Vera is waiting for him, passing Tony, who is slumped on the ground and clutching a drink.

Cast and characters

Production
The movie was directed by Joseph Losey, an American director who spent the last part of his career and life in England, after being blacklisted by Hollywood in the 1950s. His health was poor during production, causing Bogarde to provide significant assistance with the direction and finishing the film.

The film is based on The Servant, a 1948 Robin Maugham novella. The screenplay, written by Harold Pinter, stripped the plot to a more economical and chilling storyline. Pinter also appeared in the film, as a restaurant patron in one scene with a speaking part.

Writing for the British Film Institute, film critic Nick James noted:

"It was Losey who first showed Robin Maugham's novella The Servant to Bogarde in 1954. Originally separately commissioned by director Michael Anderson, Pinter stripped it of its first-person narrator, its yellow book snobbery, and the arguably anti-Semitic characterisation of Barrett—oiliness, heavy lids—replacing them with an economical language that implied rather than stated the slippage of power relations away from Tony towards Barrett."

Losey's other collaborations with Pinter, Accident and The Go-Between, share a resemblance to The Servant in that these offer the same savage indictment of the waning English class system, a theme which had been rarely addressed in British cinema.

The movie was re-released in 2013 to mark its 50th anniversary.

Reception
In 1999, the British Film Institute ranked The Servant as the 22nd-greatest British film of all time.

The Los Angeles Times film critic suggested that The Servant was the coldest film ever made, calling it "brilliantly icy".
On Rotten Tomatoes, it holds a rating of 90% and an average rating of 8.2/10 from 48 reviews. On Metacritic it holds an average rating of 94/100, based on the reviews of nine critics.

Music
The soundtrack by John Dankworth includes the song "All Gone", sung by his wife Cleo Laine. Her three different renditions of the song provide distinct emotional impacts throughout the film.

Folk guitarist Davy Graham makes a brief cameo playing the song "Rock Me Baby".

Awards
 Winner, Best Cinematography – British Society of Cinematographers (Douglas Slocombe)
 Winner, Best Cinematography – BAFTA (Douglas Slocombe)
 Winner, Best Actor – BAFTA (Dirk Bogarde)
 Winner, Most Promising Newcomer – BAFTA (James Fox)
 Nominee, Best Picture – BAFTA (Joseph Losey, Norman Priggen)
 Nominee, Best Actress – BAFTA (Sarah Miles)
 Nominee, Best Screenplay – BAFTA (Harold Pinter)
 Nominee, Most Promising Newcomer – BAFTA (Wendy Craig)
 Winner, Best Foreign Director – Italian National Syndicate of Film Journalists (Joseph Losey)
 Winner, Best Screenplay – New York Film Critics Circle (Harold Pinter)
 Nominee, Best Actor – New York Film Critics Circle (Dirk Bogarde)
 Nominee, Best Director – New York Film Critics Circle (Joseph Losey)
 Nominee, Golden Lion – Venice International Film Festival (Joseph Losey)
 Winner, Best Dramatic Screenplay – Writers' Guild of Great Britain (Harold Pinter)

See also
 BFI Top 100 British films of the 20th century – #22

Notes

Further reading

 Billington, Michael. Harold Pinter. London: Faber and Faber, 2007.  (13). Updated 2nd ed. of The Life and Work of Harold Pinter. 1996. London: Faber and Faber, 1997.  (10). Print.
 Gale, Steven H.  Sharp Cut: Harold Pinter's Screenplays and the Artistic Process. Lexington. Kentucky: The UP of Kentucky, 2003.  (10).  (13). Print.
 Gale, Steven H., ed. The Films of Harold Pinter. Albany: SUNY P, 2001. . . Print.
 Sargeant, Amy: The Servant: Palgrave Macmillan/BFI Modern Classics: 2011: 
 Weedman, Christopher (2019). "A Dark Exilic Vision of 1960s Britain: Gothic Horror and Film Noir Pervading Losey and Pinter's The Servant." Journal of Cinema and Media Studies 58.3, pp. 93–117.

External links
 "Films by Harold Pinter: The Servant 1963" at HaroldPinter.org – The Official Website of the International Playwright Harold Pinter
 "Harold Pinter & Joseph Losey", by Jamie Andrews, Harold Pinter Archive Blog, British Library, 15 June 2009.
 
  – Includes "Plot synopsis"

1963 films
1963 drama films
1960s psychological thriller films
British black-and-white films
British drama films
Films shot at Associated British Studios
Films about social class
Films based on British novels
Films directed by Joseph Losey
Films set in London
Films with screenplays by Harold Pinter
Films scored by John Dankworth
1960s English-language films
1960s British films